Bhale Jodi is a 1970 Indian Kannada language drama film written and directed by Y. R. Swamy. It stars Rajkumar in dual roles with Bharathi and Dinesh in other lead roles. The film was based on the story written by Jawar Seetharaman and was produced under Rajkamal Arts banner. The movie was remade in Telugu in 1972 as Bullema Bullodu starring Chalam and in Hindi in 1973 as Jaise Ko Taisa. He appeared as Echchamanayaka in a small drama sequence in the movie.

Cast 

 Rajkumar as Suresh / Ramesh
 Bharathi
 Dinesh as Raghava
 Balakrishna
 Nagappa
 Kupparaj
 Pandari Bai
 Ganapathi Bhat
 B. V. Radha
 Shyam
 Raghavan
 Baby Sunitha
 Baby Navitha

Soundtrack

The music of the film was composed by R. Rathna and lyrics for the soundtrack written by Chi. Udaya Shankar and R. N. Jayagopal. The album consists of six soundtracks.

See also
 Kannada films of 1970

References

External links 
 

1970 films
1970s Kannada-language films
Indian black-and-white films
Indian drama films
Twins in Indian films
Kannada films remade in other languages
Films directed by Y. R. Swamy